"Trust In You" is a song by American contemporary Christian music singer-songwriter Lauren Daigle. It was released as the third single from her debut studio album, How Can It Be, on January 22, 2016. The song became her first Hot Christian Songs No. 1, staying there for eighteen weeks. It was the most-played song of 2016 on US Christian radio and the second-biggest Christian song of 2016 overall in the US.

Music video
A music video for "Trust In You" was released on April 15, 2015. The video features Daigle singing with men in the background playing instruments.

Accolades

Charts

Weekly charts

Year-end charts

Decade-end charts

Certifications

References 

2016 singles
2015 songs
Lauren Daigle songs